The Menoken Indian Village Site, also known as Menoken Site, Verendrye Site or Apple Creek Site is an archeological site near Bismarck, North Dakota. The site, that of a fortified village occupied c. 1300, is important in the region's prehistory, as it is one of the only sites that predates sites that are more clearly associated with the historic Hidatsa, Mandan, and Arikara cultures. It was declared a National Historic Landmark in 1964, and was listed on the National Register of Historic Places in 1966. The site managed by the state as the Menoken Indian Village State Historic Site, and is open to the public.

Also listed on the National Register, in 2010, is a set of Depression Era Work Relief Construction Features at Menoken State Historic Site.

Description
The Menoken Site occupies a terrace on the south side of Apple Creek, a tributary of the Missouri River, to which it flows near Bismarck. Archaeological evidence indicates that there was originally a palisade just inside the ditch; only post holes of this structure survive. The inner area of the fortification, which has not been fully investigated, is estimated to have had between 11 and 13 semi-subterranean residential structures in it.

This site, first excavated in the 1930s, was thought for many years to be that of a Mandan village visited by the French explorer La Verendrye, but archaeological investigations in the 1990s and early 2000s have revealed evidence that the site is actually somewhat older, and that the site was probably occupied by ancestors of one of the region's major tribal groups, with an occupation period c. 1100-1300.  It was probably used as a semi-permanent settlement, from which the occupants would hunt bison and other wildlife.  Extensive finds exist here of stone tools, predominantly quarried in the Lynch Quarry vicinity to the west, as well as ceramic pottery fragments and bone tools.

The site was designated a National Historic Landmark in 1964, primarily on the basis of the belief (now known to be incorrect) that it was associated with La Verendrye, but it retains significance to its critical place in the region's prehistoric chronology, and its archaeological importance.  Elements of the site's improvements, made during the Great Depression, were listed on the National Register of Historic Places in 2010.  The site, acquired by the state in 1937, is open to the public, with a walking trail that has interpretive signage.

Depression Era Work Relief Construction Features

Depression Era Work Relief Construction Features at Menoken State Historic Site was listed on the National Register in 2010. The listing included one contributing building and two contributing objects on a  portion of a  parcel.

171st Street and 32nd Avenue NE; Bismarckvicinity 1.7-miles north of Menoken and 1-mile east from the I-94 exit at milepost 170

Late 19th & Early 20th Century Revivals / Late Gothic Revival / Picturesque. WPA Rustic

Work of the Works Progress Administration, with design directed by Russell Reid, Superintendent State Park Section. State Historical Society of North Dakota

historically Verendrye State Park

See also
Double Ditch State Historic Site, similar village site, also NRHP-listed
Depression Era Work Relief Construction Features at Double Ditch Indian Village Site State Historic Site, also NRHP-listed
List of National Historic Landmarks in North Dakota
National Register of Historic Places listings in Burleigh County, North Dakota

References

External links

 Menoken Indian Village State Historic Site - State Historical Society of North Dakota

Archaeological sites on the National Register of Historic Places in North Dakota
National Historic Landmarks in North Dakota
Native American history of North Dakota
North Dakota State Historic Sites
Protected areas of Burleigh County, North Dakota
National Register of Historic Places in Burleigh County, North Dakota
Mandan, Hidatsa, and Arikara Nation